Ngātiwai or Ngāti Wai is a Māori iwi of the east coast of the Northland Region of New Zealand. Its historical tribal area or rohe stretched from Cape Brett in the north to Takatū Point on Tawharanui Peninsula in the south and out to Great Barrier Island, the Poor Knights Islands and other offshore islands.

Descendants of Ngātiwai include brothers Jim, Ian and Winston Peters, artist Shona Rapira Davies, and writer Paula Morris.

History

Early history
Ngātiwai trace their ancestry to one of the earliest  settlers of Te Tai-tokerau, Manaia, who was transformed into stone, with his family and servant Paekō atop Mount Manaia in the Whangarei Harbour. His descendant Manaia II, some 14 generations later, was the rangatira of Ngāti Manaia established. 

Following a battle with Ngāpuhi at their pā at Mimiwhāngata, Ngāti Manaia fled out to sea, along the eastern coast, and on to the offshore islands. They became adept seafarers and were known as Ngātiwai-ki-te-moana under the leadership of Te Rangihōkaia and siblings Torematao and Te Rangapū.

Known for their ocean traditions and customs and coastal raiding, Ngātiwai ("descendants of the sea") were often accompanied by a guardian sea-hawk or Tūkaiaia, whereby other tribes would be warned that Ngātiwai were on the move – either at sea or on land.

The iwi has become associated with Ngāpuhi.

Tribal links and movement
After the time of Te Rangihōkaia, a descendant of Manaia, a number of key marriages cemented the relationship between Ngātiwai and the Kawerau hapū of Ngāti Rehua and Ngāti Manuhiri. During the late 1700s and early 1800s the Ngāpuhi tribes pushed east toward Kawakawa, Te Rāwhiti and the Whangaruru coast, where they absorbed other tribes, including Ngāti Manu, Te Kapotai, Te Uri o Rata, Ngare Raumati and Ngātiwai.

Modern history
In April 2006, Ngātiwai sued the Department of Conservation over its handling of consultation issues in Northland regarding a marine reserve.

Notable people

 Briar Grace-Smith, writer
 Paula Morris, writer
 Ian Peters, politician
 Jim Peters, politician
 Winston Peters, politician
 Shona Rapira Davies, artist
 Shane Reti, politician
 Laly Haddon, Māori All Black
 Paratene Te Manu, Ngāti Wai chief and warrior

See also
List of Māori iwi

References

External links
 Ngatiwai Trust Board

 
Northland Region
Iwi and hapū